The title Hero of the Soviet Union was the highest distinction of the Soviet Union. It was awarded 12,775 times. Due to the large size of the list, it has been broken up into multiple pages.

 David Tavadze ru
 Afanasy Tavakov ru
 Pyotr Tavrovsky ru
 Vladimir Tagiltsev ru
 Aleksey Tazaev ru
 Tokybai Taygaraev ru
 Vasily Talalaev ru
 Viktor Talalikhin
 Nikolai Talalushkin ru
 Konstantin Talakh ru
 Arnaldo Tamayo Méndez
 Vladimir Tambiev ru
 Pyotr Tananaev ru
 Aleksandr Tanaseychuk ru
 Vasily Tanachev ru
 Pyotr Tankov ru
 Ivan Tankopy ru
 Nikolai Tansky ru
 Grigory Tantsorov ru
 Vasily Tantsurenko ru
 Ivan Tantsyura ru
 Samuil Tapikov ru
 Yuri Taptunov ru
 Aleksandr Tarakanov ru
 Aleksey Tarakanov ru
 Nikolai Nikolaevich Tarakanov ru
 Nikolai Sergeevich Tarakanov ru
 Nikolai Tarakanchikov ru
 Grigory Taran ru
 Pavel Taran (twice)
 Pyotr Taran ru
 Ivan Taranenko
 Ivan Taranov ru
 Vasily Taranovsky ru
 Pyotr Tarantsev ru
 Ismailbek Taranchiev
 Vladimir Tarasevich ru
 Konstantin Tarasevich ru
 Aleksandr Tarasenko ru
 Vasily Fyodorovich Tarasenko ru
 Vasily Fomich Tarasenko ru
 Ivan Tarasenko ru
 Pavel Tarasenko ru
 Pavel Taraskin ru
 Dmitry Taraskov ru
 Aleksey Tarasov ru
 Georgy Tarasov ru
 Grigory Tarasov ru
 Dmitry Vasilylevich Tarasov ru
 Dmitry Zakharovich Tarasov ru
 Yevgeny Tarasov ru
 Konstantin Tarasov ru
 Luka Tarasov ru
 Nikolai Arsentevich Tarasov ru
 Nikolai Grigorievich Tarasov ru
 Pavel Tarasov
 Pyotr Maksimovich Tarasov ru
 Pyotr Mikhailovich Tarasov ru
 Fyodor Yefremovich Tarasov ru
 Fyodor Illarionovich Tarasov ru
 Vasily Tarlovsky ru
 Abram Tarnopolsky ru
 Iosif Tarsukov ru
 Semyon Tartykov ru
 Sergey Tarkhov ru
 Grigory Taryanik ru
 Kenilbay Taskulov ru
 Boris Tasuy ru
 Dmitry Tatarenko ru
 Ivan Tatarinov ru
 Leonid Tatarinov ru
 Pyotr Tatarkin ru
 Aleksey Tatarnikov ru
 Pyotr Tatarchenkov ru
 Aidogy Takhirov ru
 Ilya Takhtarov ru
 Mikhail Tashkin ru
 Yuri Tvarkovsky ru
 Georgy Tvauri ru
 Mikhail Tvelenev ru
 Arsenty Tverdokhlebov ru
 Ilya Tverdokhlebov ru
 Dmitry Tveritinov ru
 Pavel Tebekin ru
 Anatoly Tebenkov ru
 Vladimir Tegentsov ru
 Pavel Tezikov ru
 Anatoly Televinov ru
 Grigory Telegin ru
 Yakov Telechenko ru
 Andrey Teleshev ru
 Yevgeny Teleshev ru
 Mikhail Teleshevsky ru
 Nikolai Telyakov ru
 Leonid Telyatnikov
 Seytkhan Temirbaev ru
 Abram Tamnik ru
 Viktor Temnov ru
 Ivan Temchenko ru
 Vasily Temchuk ru
 Ivan Tenishchev ru
 Mikhail Teodorovich ru
 Mikhail Petrovich Teplov ru
 Mikhail Fedotovich Teplov ru
 Sergey Teplov ru
 Mikhail Teploukhov ru
 Dmitry Teplyakov ru
 Martyn Teplyakov ru
 Arsen Ter-Oganov ru
 Yevgeny Terezov ru
 Akaky Tereladze ru
 Nikolai Terenkov ru
 Boris Terentev ru
 Grigory Terentev ru
 Ivan Teryokhin ru
 Makar Teryokhin
 Nikolai Teryokhin ru
 Filipp Terekhov ru
 Sergey Tereshkevich ru
 Pyotr Teryoshkin ru
 Aleksey Tereshkov ru
 Valentina Tereshkova
 Vasily Tereshchenko ru
 Mikhail Tereshchenko ru
 Nikolai Tereshchenko ru
 Spiridon Tereshchenko ru
 Ivan Tereshchuk ru
 Vladimir Terletsky ru
 Ivan Ternavsky ru
 Boris Ternovoy ru
 Vladimir Ternovoy ru
 Pyotr Ternovoy ru
 Georgy Ternovsky ru
 Pyotr Tertyshny ru
 Pyotr Teryaev ru
 Nikolai Tesakov ru
 Richard Tesařík
 Ilya Teslenko ru
 Pavel Teslenko ru
 Nikolai Testov ru
 Mamasaly Teshebaev ru
 Shota Tibua ru
 Pyotr Tikilyaynen ru
 Grigory Tikunov ru
 Aleksandr Timakov ru
 Vasily Timonov ru
 Fyodor Timonov ru
 Aleksey Timofeyev ru
 Andrey Timofeyev ru
 Vasily Timofeyev ru
 Dmitry Timofeevich Timofeyev ru
 Dmitry Fomich Timofeyev ru
 Konstantin Timofeyev ru
 Nikolai Aleksandrovich Timofeyev ru
 Nikolai Pavlovich Timofeyev ru
 Ryurik Timofeyev ru
 Severyan Timofeyev ru
 Sergey Timofeyev ru
 Ivan Timofeenko ru
 Gury Timokhin ru
 Anatoly Timoshenko ru
 Afanasy Timoshenko ru
 Vladimir Ivanovich Timoshenko ru
 Vladimir Yakovlevich Timoshenko ru
 Ivan Timoshenko ru
 Mikhail Timoshenko ru
 Semyon Timoshenko (twice)
 Fyodor Timoshenko ru
 Aleksandr Timoshchenko ru
 Vasily Timoshchuk ru
 Vladimir Timoshchuk ru
 Dmitry Timoshchuk ru
 Georgy Timushev ru
 Vasily Timchenko ru
 Pyotr Timchenko ru
 Ivan Timchuk ru
 Pavel Timshin ru
 Nikolai Tinkov ru
 Aleksandr Tipanov ru
 Stepan Titarenko ru
 Andrey Titanko
 Konstantin Titenkov ru
 Ivan Titkov ru
 Ivan Titlin ru
 Mikhail Titlov ru
 Aleksey Timofeevich Titov ru
 Aleksey Fyodorovich Titov ru
 Andrey Titov ru
 Valentin Titov ru
 Vasily Titov ru
 Vladimir Titov
 German Titov
 Ivan Antonovich Titov ru
 Nikolai Mikhailovich Titov ru
 Nikolai Petrovich Titov ru
 Fyodor Titov ru
 Fyodor Titov ru
 Vladimir Titovich ru
 Sergey Titovka ru
 Leonid Tikhmyanov ru
 Anatoly Tikhov ru
 Aleksandr Tikhomirov ru
 Vladimir Tikhomirov ru
 Ivan Vasilyevich Tikhomirov ru
 Ivan Nikolaevich Tikhomirov ru
 Ilya Tikhomirov ru
 Stepan Tikhomirov ru
 Boris Tikhomolov ru
 Andrey Tikhonenko ru
 Ivan Tikhonenko ru
 Aleksey Tikhonov ru
 Boris Tikhonov ru
 Vasily Gavrilovich Tikhonov ru
 Vasily Ivanovich Tikhonov (soldier) ru
 Vasily Ivanovich Tikhonov (politruk) ru
 Viktor Ivanovich Tikhonov ru
 Viktor Pavlovich Tikhonov ru
 Grigory Tikhonov ru
 Konstantin Tikhonov ru
 Mikhail Ivanovich Tikhonov ru
 Mikhail Fyodorovich Tikhonov
 Nikolai ViktorovichTkachyov Tikhonov ru
 Nikolai Ivanovich Tikhonov ru
 Pavel Tikhonov ru
 Viktor Tishko ru
 Aleksandr Tishenko ru
 Matevy Tishchenko ru
 Mikhail Tishchenko ru
 Konstantin Tkabladze ru
 Aleksandr Tkanko ru
 Vladimir Tkachyov ru
 Grigory Tkachyov ru
 Makar Tkachyov ru
 Nikolai Tkachyov ru
 Fyodor Tkachyov ru
 Yuri Tkachevsky ru
 Aleksandr Kuzmich Tkachenko ru
 Aleksandr Prokhorovich Tkachenko ru
 Andrey Grigorievich Tkachenko ru
 Andrey Yakovlevich Tkachenko ru
 Vasily Tkachenko ru
 Vladimir Tkachenko ru
 Grigory Tikhonovich Tkachenko ru
 Grigory Trofimovich Tkachenko ru
 Ivan Vasilyevich Tkachenko ru
 Ivan Fillipovich Tkachenko ru
 Ilya Ivanovich Tkachenko (1914—1979) ru
 Ilya Ivanovich Tkachenko (1924—1943) ru
 Mikhail Tkachenko ru
 Nikanor Tkachenko ru
 Pyotr Tkachenko ru
 Platon Tkachenko ru
 Yakov Tkachenko ru
 Ivan Tkachuk ru
 Mikhail Tobolenko ru
 Aleksandr Tovpenko ru
 Vasily Tovstukho ru
 Kaurbek Toguzov ru
 Vasily Tokarev ru
 Yegor Tokarev ru
 Moisey Tokarev ru
 Nikolai Tokarev ru
 Sergey Tokarev ru
 Stepan Tokarev ru
 Mikhail Tokarenko ru
 Nikita Tokarlikov ru
 Rakhimzhan Tokataev ru
 Yevgeny Tokmakov ru
 Yakov Tokmakov ru
 Ivan Tokmin ru
 Grigory Tokuev ru
 Fyodor Tolbukhin
 Vasily Tolkachyov ru
 Grigory Tolkachyov ru
 Mikhail Tolkachyov ru
 Aleksandr Tolmachyov ru
 Aleksey Tolmachyov ru
 Grigory Tolmachyov ru
 Mikhail Tolmachyov ru
 Nikolai Tolmachyov ru
 Boris Toloknov ru
 Vasily Tolstikov ru
 Yevgeny Tolstikov
 Pavel Tolstikov ru
 Valentin Tolstov ru
 Vasily Tolstov ru
 Pyotr Tolstov ru
 Ivan Tolstoy ru
 Stepan Tolstoy ru
 Nikolai Tolstukhin ru
 Vasily Tolstykh ru
 Vasily Tomarov ru
 Pyotr Tomasevich ru
 Nikolai Tomashevich ru
 Ivan Tomashevsky ru
 Kazimir Tomashevsky ru
 Valentin Tomzhevsky ru
 Leonid Tomilin ru
 Pavel Tomilin ru
 Arsenty Tomilov ru
 Goergy Tomilovsky ru
 Vitaly Tomilovskikh ru
 Yegor Tomko ru
 Aleksey Tomsky ru
 Ivan Tonkonog ru
 Anatoly Topaller ru
 Mamadali Topvaldyev ru
 Nikolai Topolnikov ru
 Arsenty Topolsky ru
 Vitalu Topolsky ru
 Ivan Toporikov ru
 Andrey Toporkov ru
 Ivan Toporkov ru
 Yakov Toporkov ru
 Filipp Torgovtsev ru
 Pyotr Torhunakov ru
 Ivan Torshinsky ru
 Ivan Tornev ru
 Aleksey Toropkin ru
 Aleksandr Toropov ru
 Artemy Topopov ru
 Nikolai Toropchin ru
 Aleksandr Tortsev ru
 Nikolai Torchigin ru
 Nikolai Totmin ru
 Dmitry Totmyanin ru
 Tulegen Tokhtarov ru
 Vikenty Toshchenko ru
 Ivan Vasilyevich Travkin
 Ivan Mikhailovich Travkin ru
 Pyotr Traynin ru
 Yegor Trakhtaev ru
 Nikolai Tregubov ru
 Dmitry Tremasov ru
 Konstantin Trembach ru
 Ivan Lukich Tretyak ru
 Ivan Moiseevich Tretyak ru
 Nikolai Tretyakov ru
 Konstantin Treshchyov ru
 Aleksey Tribunsky ru
 Aleksandr Tripolsky ru
 Aleksandr Trifonov ru
 Boris Trifonov ru
 Ivan Trifonov ru
 Feoktist Trifonov ru
 Gennady Troitsky ru
 Nikolai Trostinsky ru
 Sergey Trofimenko
 Andrey Trofimov ru
 Vladimir Trofimov ru
 Dmitry Trofimov ru
 Yevgeny Trofimov ru
 Ivan Andreevich Trofimov ru
 Ivan Maksimovich Trofimov ru
 Nikolai Trofimov ru
 Nikolai Trofimov ru
 Fyodor Trofimov
 Aleksey Troshin ru
 Aleksandr Troshkov ru
 Nadezhda Troyan
 Vasily Trubachyov ru
 Vasily Trubachenko ru
 Ivan Trubin ru
 Mikhail Trubitsyn ru
 Nikolai Trubitsyn ru
 Valery Trubov ru
 Andrey Trud ru
 Vasily Trudolyubov ru
 Vladimir Truzhnikov ru
 Pavel Trunkin ru
 Pavel Trunov ru
 Viktor Trusov ru
 Yevgeny Trusov ru
 Ivan Trusov ru
 Mikhail Trusov ru
 Pyotr Trufanov ru
 Pyotr Trukhanov ru
 Ivan Trukhin ru
 Konstantin Trukhinov ru
 Andrey Trukhov ru
 Lavrenty Truchak ru
 Ivan Trushev ru
 Vasily Trushechkin ru
 Vasily Andreevich Trushin ru
 Vasily Prokofevich Trushin ru
 Vasily Trushkin ru
 Ilya Trushkov ru
 Nikolai Trushkov ru
 Sergey Trushkovsky ru
 Pyotr Trushnikov ru
 Aleksandr Trynin ru
 Yerminingeld Tryasin ru
 Aleksandr Tryaskin ru
 Andrey Tryaskin ru
 Andrey Tsaplin ru
 Pavel Tsaplin ru
 Ivan Tsapov ru
 Aleksandr Tsaryov ru
 Aleksey Tsaryov ru
 Aleksey Tsaregorodsky ru
 Lavrenty Tsarenko ru
 Boris Tsarikov ru
 Konstantin Tsaritsyn ru
 Vladimir Tsaryuk ru
 Vyacheslav Tsvetaev
 Vasily Tsvetkov ru
 Stepan Tsvik ru
 Pyotr Tsvily ru
 Mikhail Tselak ru
 Kirill Tselik ru
 Georgy Tselio ru
 Nikolai Tselkovsky ru
 Sergey Tselykh ru
 Grigory Tsibenko ru
 Ivan Tsibizov ru
 Leonid Tsibizov ru
 Vasily Tsibulko ru
 Viktor Tsivchinsky ru
 Platon Tsikoridze ru
 Boris Tsindelis ru
 Dmitry Tsirubin ru
 Mikhail Tsiselsky
 Yefim Tsitovsky ru
 Irakly Tsitsishvili ru
 Gennady Tsokolaev ru
 Mariya Tsukanova
 Boris Tzulukidze ru
 Stepan Tsuprenkov ru
 Aleksandr Tsurtsumiya ru
 Konstantin Tsutskiridze ru
 Ivan Tskhovrebov ru
 Pyotr Tsyban ru
 Ivan Tsybenko ru
 Ivan Tsybin ru
 Alekseu Tsybulyov ru
 Nikolai Tsybulsky ru
 Vasily Tsygankov ru
 Pyotr Tsygankov ru
 Yevgeny Tsyganov ru
 Mikhail Tsyganov ru
 Nikolai Tsyganov ru
 Pyotr Tsyganov ru
 Mikhail Tsykin ru
 Pavel Tsylyov ru
 Andrey Tsymbal ru
 Vasily Tsymbal ru
 Ivan Tsymbal ru
 Vasily Tsymbalenko ru
 Ivan Tsymbalist ru
 Andrey Tsymbalyuk ru
 Yevgeny Tsyplenkov ru
 Nikolai Tsyplukhin ru
 Vasily Tsys ru
 Aleksandr Tsytsarkin ru
 Kydran Tugambaev ru
 Yelisy Tugushin ru
 Sergey Tuzhlikov ru
 Vasily Tuzov ru
 Mikhail Tuzov ru
 Nikolai Tuzov ru
 Leonid Tuygunov ru
 Urmash Tuktubaev ru
 Zhambyl Tulaev
 Cholpolbai Tuleberdiev ru
 Dmitry Tulinov ru
 Aleksandr Tulintsev ru
 Konstantin Tulupov ru
 Andrey Tulnikov ru
 Mikhail Tumakshin ru
 Ivan Tumanov ru
 Viktor Tumar ru
 Grigory Tupikin ru
 Andrey Tupitsin ru
 Grigory Tupitsyn ru
 Ivan Tupitsyn ru
 Dzhurakul Turaev ru
 Mikhail Turbai ru
 Viktor Turbin
 Dmitry Turbin ru
 Pyotr Turbin ru
 Mikhail Turgel ru
 Fyodor Turgenev ru
 Saidkul Turdyev ru
 Yevgeny Turenko ru
 Boris Turzhansky
 Aleksey Turikov ru
 Ivan Turkenich
 Denis Turkov ru
 Nikolai Turkov ru
 Vladislav Turkuli ru
 Fyodor Turov ru
 Nikita Turovets ru
 Vasily Turovtsev ru
 Gennady Turunov ru
 Goergy Turukhanov ru
 Nikolai Turtsevich ru
 Nikolai Turchenko ru
 Pavel Turchenko ru
 Vasily Turchin ru
 Nikolai Turchin ru
 Adam Turchinsky ru
 Valeryan Turygin ru
 Pinkhus Turyan
 Zinaida Tusnolobova-Marchenko
 Pyotr Tutukov ru
 Semyon Tutuchenko ru
 Ivan Tuftov ru
 Aleksandr Tukhlanov ru
 Georgy Tuchin ru
 Ivan Tushev ru
 Kuzma Tushnolobov ru
 Ismail Tkhagushev ru
 Grigory Tkhor
 Aleksandr Tkhorzhevsky ru
 Daniil Tykvach ru
 Georgy Tyrin ru
 Vladimir Tyrsa ru
 Nikolai Tyrykin ru
 Vladimir Tytar ru
 Vladimir Tyshevich ru
 Kozhakhmet Tyshkanbaev ru
 Vasily Tyshkevich ru
 Ivan Tyshkun ru
 Yevgeny Tyshchik ru
 Vladimir Tyukov ru
 Ivan Vladimirovich Tyulenev
 Ivan Nikolaevich Tyulenev ru
 Fyodor Tyulenev ru
 Sergey Tyulenin ru
 Aleksandr Tyulin ru
 Aleksey Tyulga ru
 Mikhail Tyulkin ru
 Yakov Tyulkin ru
 Fyodor Tyumentsev ru
 Fyodor Tyunin ru
 Sergey Tyurikov ru
 Aleksandr Tyurin ru
 Aleksandr Tyurin ru
 Vasily Tyurin ru
 Ivan Tyurin ru
 Konstantin Tyurin ru
 Leonid Tyurin ru
 Mikhail Tyurin ru
 Dmitry Tyurkin ru
 Pyotr Tyunev ru
 Aleksandr Tyuryumin ru
 Nikolai Tyusin ru
 Nikolai Tyavkin ru
 Yefim Tyagushev ru
 Aleksey Tyapushkin ru
 Gavriil Tyashchenko ru

References 

 
 Russian Ministry of Defence Database «Подвиг Народа в Великой Отечественной войне 1941—1945 гг.» [Feat of the People in the Great Patriotic War 1941-1945] (in Russian).

Lists of Heroes of the Soviet Union